Bag and Baggage is a 1923 American silent comedy film directed by Finis Fox and starring Gloria Grey, John Roche and Carmelita Geraghty.

Cast
 Gloria Grey as Hope Anthony 
 John Roche as Hal Tracy 
 Carmelita Geraghty as Lola Cooper 
 Paul Weigel as Philip Anthony 
 Adele Farrington as Mrs. Cooper 
 Arthur Stuart Hull as Jathrow Billings 
 Fred Kelsey as Fred 
 Harry Dunkinson as Hotel Detective 
 R.D. MacLean as Cyrus Irwin 
 Doreen Turner as The Girl 
 Ned Grey as The Boy

References

Bibliography
 Munden, Kenneth White. The American Film Institute Catalog of Motion Pictures Produced in the United States, Part 1. University of California Press, 1997.

External links

1923 films
1923 comedy films
Silent American comedy films
Films directed by Finis Fox
American silent feature films
1920s English-language films
American black-and-white films
Selznick Pictures films
1920s American films